Flory Jean Michaël Yangao (born 13 January 2002) is a Central African footballer who plays as a right-back for Olympic Real and the Central African Republic national team.

Club career
A youth international for the Central African Republic, he was named as part of the team of the tournament at the 2021 Africa U-20 Cup of Nations. He debuted with the senior Central African Republic national team in a 2–2 2021 Africa Cup of Nations qualification tie with Burundi on 26 March 2021.

References

External links
 
 
 

2002 births
Living people
Central African Republic footballers
Central African Republic international footballers
Association football fullbacks
Central African Republic under-20 international footballers